Sidell is a village in Sidell Township, Vermilion County, Illinois, United States. It is part of the Danville, Illinois Metropolitan Statistical Area. The population was 617 at the 2010 census.

History
Both the town and the township of Sidell were named after John Sidell, who came to the area from Ohio in 1861 and purchased  on the banks of the Little Vermilion River. In 1888, the town had three main industries aside from farming:  tiles, bricks and ice.

Geography

Demographics

At the 2000 census, there were 626 people, 237 households and 182 families residing in the village. The racial makeup of the village was 99.68% White, 0.16% African American and 0.16% Native American. Hispanic or Latino of any race were 0.64% of the population.

There were 237 households, of which 38.0% had children under the age of 18 living with them, 62.0% were married couples living together, 7.2% had a female householder with no husband present, and 23.2% were non-families. 19.8% of all households were made up of individuals, and 11.0% had someone living alone who was 65 years of age or older. The average household size was 2.64 and the average family size was 3.00.

28.8% of the population were under the age of 18, 6.4% from 18 to 24, 30.4% from 25 to 44, 21.1% from 45 to 64, and 13.4% who were 65 years of age or older. The median age was 36 years. For every 100 females, there were 100.0 males. For every 100 females age 18 and over, there were 100.9 males.

The median household income was $31,923 and the median family income was $39,792. Males had a median income of $30,192 compared $19,792 for females. The per capita income for the village was $15,061. About 7.7% of families and 9.6% of the population were below the poverty line, including 6.7% of those under age 18 and 10.1% of those age 65 or over.

References

Villages in Vermilion County, Illinois
Villages in Illinois
Populated places established in 1861
1861 establishments in Illinois